Axel Dumas (born 3 July 1970) is a French billionaire heir and business executive. He is the chief executive officer (CEO) of Hermès, and a sixth-generation member of the Hermès-Dumas family.

Early life
Axel Dumas was born on 3 July 1970 in Neuilly-sur-Seine near Paris. His ancestor five times removed, Thierry Hermès, was a German French immigrant who founded Hermès in 1837. His paternal uncle, Jean-Louis Dumas, was the CEO of Hermès. His father, Olivier Dumas, is a physician and the author of many articles about  Jules Verne. His mother died in 2003. His cousin, Pierre-Alexis Dumas, is Hermes's artistic director. He is a sixth-generation member of the Hermès-Dumas family.

Dumas earned a bachelor's degree in Philosophy from Paris-Sorbonne University and a master of Laws. He graduated from Sciences Po, and he attended an executive program at the Harvard Business School.

Career
Dumas was an investment banker for Paribas in Beijing, China from 1995 to 1997, in Paris from 1997 to 1999, and in New York City from 1999 to 2003.

Dumas joined Hermès as an auditor in 2003. He became the CEO of its jewellery division in 2006, and the CEO of its leather goods division in 2008. He was appointed as chief operating officer and joint CEO of the company alongside Patrick Thomas in June 2012, and he succeeded Thomas as CEO in February 2014.

Personal life
Dumas is married to Elisabeth Franck, a journalist for Libération.

With his family, Dumas is an heir to a 30 billion Euro fortune, making them France's third richest family as of 2017.

References

Living people
1970 births
People from Neuilly-sur-Seine
French people of German descent
Paris-Sorbonne University alumni
Sciences Po alumni
Harvard Business School alumni
French chief executives
Hermès-Dumas family